Clement Daniel Rockey (4 September 1889 – 15 August 1975) was a bishop of the Methodist Church, elected in 1941.

Biography

He was born in Cawnpore, India, a son of the Noble Lee Rockey, an American missionary pioneer in India. Clement entered the North India Annual Conference of the Methodist Episcopal Church in 1914.  Prior to his election to the episcopacy, he served as a missionary, an educator, and a district superintendent. For some years he was chaplain to British Methodist troops in Bareilly. He was elected bishop by the Methodist Central Conference of Southern Asia. He returned to the United States and lived out his life in Eugene, Oregon.

Selected writings
Making and Telling Bible Stories, also Roman-Urdu, Kahani ka Banana aur Sunana, 1923.
52 Lessons on Christian Life and Practice, Masihi Zindagi aur Usul, 1926.
Book of Worship for village work, 1935.
Pamphlet, Come and Let Us Worship, 1945.

See also

List of bishops of the United Methodist Church

References
Leete, Frederick DeLand, Methodist Bishops.  Nashville, The Methodist Publishing House, 1948.

1889 births
1975 deaths
American Methodist missionaries
American pamphleteers
American male non-fiction writers
American religious writers
Bishops of The Methodist Church (USA)
American chaplains
Indian bishops
Methodist missionaries in India
Urdu-language non-fiction writers
Urdu-language short story writers
English–Urdu translators
Methodist writers
People from Kanpur
Methodist chaplains
American military chaplains
20th-century translators
Missionary linguists